The Center for Telehealth & E-Health Law (CTeL), established in 1995 by a consortium including the Mayo Foundation, Cleveland Clinic Foundation, Texas Children's Hospital, and the Mid-West Rural Telemedicine Consortium, is a non-profit organization committed to overcoming legal and regulatory barriers to the utilization of telehealth and related e-health services. CTeL, based in Washington, D.C., specializes in compiling, analyzing and disseminating information on legal and regulatory issues information associated with telemedicine. It also handles underlying issues such as licensure and reimbursement. 
 
CTeL briefs public policymakers, writes reports, and provides testimony in support of telehealth.  In its materials, CTeL argues that expanding the use of telehealth can improve patient safety, reduce medical errors, and increase patient access to primary and specialty care in both rural and urban settings. CTeL offers a variety of services, including involvement in public policy.  Their Telehealth Policy Clerkship Program is available to second and third year law students interested in public policy and legal issues as they apply to advancing communication technologies in the practice of medicine.

In 2004, CTeL was recognized by the United States Department of Commerce: "[The] progress there has been in resolving such issues can be attributed to a very recent and concentrated effort by such stakeholders as... Center for Telemedicine Law, and the Office for the Advancement of Telehealth (OAT), within the Department of Health and Human Services (HHS)." – Innovation, Demand, & Investment in Telehealth, US Commerce Department, Feb. 2004.

References

External links 
 CTeL
 Office for the Advancement of Telehealth

Medical and health organizations based in Washington, D.C.
Health informatics organizations